During the 1953–54 Scottish football season, Celtic competed in Scottish Division A.

Results

Scottish Division A

Scottish Cup

Scottish League Cup

References

Scottish football championship-winning seasons
Celtic F.C. seasons
Celtic